David Augusto Sotelo Rosas (born 11 November 1957) is a Mexican politician from the Party of the Democratic Revolution. From 2000 to 2003 he served as Deputy of the LVIII Legislature of the Mexican Congress representing Guerrero. He previously served in the Congress of Guerrero from 1989 to 1992.

References

Living people
1957 births
20th-century Mexican politicians
21st-century Mexican politicians
Party of the Democratic Revolution politicians
Members of the Congress of Guerrero
Universidad Autónoma Metropolitana alumni
National Autonomous University of Mexico alumni
20th-century Mexican lawyers
Politicians from Guerrero
People from Acapulco
Deputies of the LVIII Legislature of Mexico
Members of the Chamber of Deputies (Mexico) for Guerrero